Senator Posey may refer to:

Adrian Posey (1857–1922), Maryland State Senate
Bill Posey (born 1947), Florida State Senate
Thomas Posey (1750–1818), Louisiana State Senate